Joannas is a commune in the Ardèche department in southern France.

Population

Monuments and places 
There are two castles at Joannas: the castle of Logères was built in the 12th century. The castle of Joannas which contains the town hall, was inscribed in 1985 as an historical monument.

The church is named Notre-Dame de l'Annonciation.

See also
Communes of the Ardèche department

References

Communes of Ardèche
Ardèche communes articles needing translation from French Wikipedia